The Ministry of Agriculture (MOA) is a government ministry responsible for agriculture in Zimbabwe, including the management of agricultural land use, but not land reform. Dr Anxious Jongwe Masuka is the incumbent Minister of Lands, Agriculture and Rural Resettlement, having been appointed on 14 August 2020. Currently, the deputy ministers are Douglas Karoro and Vangelis Haritatos. The ministry is located in Harare.

The ministry oversees:
Veterinary Technical Services
 AGRITEX
 Department of Research and Specialist Services

State corporations
State corporations under the direction of the Ministry of Agriculture include:
Agricultural Bank of Zimbabwe (AGRIBANK)
Tobacco Industry and Marketing Board (TIMB)
Pig Industry Board (PIB)
Agricultural Rural Development Authority(ARDA)
Grain Marketing Board (GMB)
Tobacco Research Board (TRB)
Cold Storage Commission (CSC)

Ministers of Agriculture

Deputy Ministers of Agriculture 

 Simba Makoni (May 1980 – January 1981)
 Jock Kay (22 January 1988 – March/April 1990)
 Sylvester Nguni (c. 2006)
 Seiso Moyo (11 October 2011 – 21 December 2012)
 Paddy Zhanda (10 October 2013 - ?)
Davis Marapira (30 November 2017 - ?)
 Douglas Karoro (2018–present)
 Vangelis Haritatos (2018–present)

See also
 Ministry of Lands and Land Resettlement

References

External links
 Ministry of Agriculture official site

Government of Zimbabwe
Agricultural organisations based in Zimbabwe
Zimbabwe
Harare
Ministries established in 1980
1980 establishments in Zimbabwe